The Rovers is a 1980 album by the music group The Irish Rovers. It was their first album after they rebranded themselves as The Rovers, dropping "Irish" from the group name, and includes their crossover country hit "Wasn't That a Party".

Track listing 
Side 1
 "Mexican Girl"
 "Yo Yo Man"
 "Tara" 
 "Matchstalk Men and Matchstalk Cats and Dogs"
 "Pheasant Plucker's Son"
Side 2
 "Wasn't That a Party"
 "Fireflyte"
 "Movie Cowboys"
 "Victory Chimes"
 "Here's to the Horses"

U.S. release 
The album was released in the United States as "Wasn't That a Party." It had the same songs as "The Rovers," but a different cover.

Chart performance

External links 
Rovers: the Irish Rovers at the Balladeers

The Irish Rovers albums
1980 albums